Boby John (born 31 August 1970) is an Indian film sound designer  and mixing engineer. He has worked in various Hindi, Marathi, Malayalam and Assamese feature films, documentary films, short films and television advertisements. He is one of India's best sync sound editors. He owns a mixing studio, Prathibha, at Mumbai.

Early life
Boby John was born on 31 August 1970 in Vazhakulam, a small town near Muvattupuzha in Ernakulam district of Kerala state. He completed his schooling from Thekkummala St. Rita's LP School and Vazhakulam Infant Jesus High School. He then joined at Nirmala College, Muvattupuzha for his pre-degree course and later completed B.Sc in Physics in 1991. In 1992, he joined at the Film and Television Institute of India, Pune, for the three year postgraduate diploma course in sound recording and sound design.

Selected filmography

Awards

References

External links

Indian sound designers
Indian sound editors
Film and Television Institute of India alumni
Film musicians from Kerala
People from Muvattupuzha
Living people
1970 births